George Allen Davis (August 5, 1857 – February 12, 1920) was a U.S. lawyer, patron of the arts and a politician from New York.

Life 

He was Supervisor of the Town of Lancaster from 1888 to 1891, and from 1893 to 1897; and a delegate to the New York State Constitutional Convention of 1894.

He was a member of the New York State Senate from 1896 to 1910, sitting in the 119th, 120th, 121st, 122nd, 123rd, 124th, 125th, 126th, 127th, 128th, 129th (all eleven 49th D.), 130th, 131st, 132nd and 133rd New York State Legislatures (all four 50th D.).

In 1909 Davis was among a trio of finalist judges, including, Sir Byron Edmund Walker of the Canadian Imperial Bank of Commerce in Toronto and Sir George Christie Gibbons of London, Ontario, all patrons of  the arts, whom were asked to join the selection committee for the Bell Telephone Memorial and choose the design sculptor for a major Bell Telephone monument in Brantford, Canada.

Davis is buried in his family's mausoleum at Lancaster Rural Cemetery.

No-hitter pitcher Iron Davis (1890–1961) was his son.

Sources 

 Citations 

 Bibliography 
 Journal of the Constitutional Convention of the State of New York 1894 (Albany, 1895; pg. 14)
 Official New York from Cleveland to Hughes by Charles Elliott Fitch (Hurd Publishing Co., New York and Buffalo, 1911, Vol. IV; pg. 364ff)
 History of Lancaster, NY transcribed from Our County and Its People: A Descriptive History of Erie County, NY by Truman C. White (1898)
 Ex-State Senator George A. Davis in NYT on February 13, 1920

External links

 

1857 births
1920 deaths
Republican Party New York (state) state senators
People from Lancaster, New York
Town supervisors in New York (state)